Overcast Off is an American indie rock band formed in Tucson, Arizona and currently located in Boston, Massachusetts. After a successful west coast tour in 2009, the band started to gain a fair amount of underground buzz. Overcast Off has described their sound as "electric folk music that doesn't sound like folk music." In early 2010, they participated in the Camp Wildcat benefit concert at Club Congress.

The group has released four albums during the 2010s. Overcast Off's self-titled debut was released in 2010, Utopia's Expatriate was released in 2011, You Didn't Know Me was released in 2015, and Rabid Underdogs, featuring the minor hit American French Revolution, was released in 2020.

The band's genre is generally considered indie rock, lo-fi, or folk.

Discography

Studio albums
 Overcast Off (2010)
 Utopia's Expatriate (2011)
 You Didn't Know Me (2015)
 Rabid Underdogs (2020)

References

External links
 

Indie rock musical groups from Arizona
Musical groups from Tucson, Arizona